Palestinianism is term occasionally used to denote the national political movement of the Palestinian people. It is a relatively recent coinage whose origins are disputed. It gained currency by its use in the works of Edward Said and to describe a certain vein of theology opposed to Christian Zionism and that challenges Zionism and the right of Israel to exist.

History of the word 
Though some date the emergence of the term to recent decades, – the word does not figure in the 1989 Oxford English Dictionary – it was employed as early as 1970 when Alfred Sherman, the London correspondent for Haaretz at the time, expressed surprise that the Palestinians' bid for independent statehood had garnered widespread support in the West Sherman laboured under the impression that a distinct Palestinian identity was a late product of the 1960s, and in particular began to emerge after disillusionment with the outcome of the Six-Day War, in the aftermath of which Palestinians realized they must rely on their own resources, rather than on the broader Arab world, to secure their aspirations. Israelis were uncomfortable with such a proposal, he concluded, since the aspiration of Palestinians for nationhood ('Palestinianism') mirrored exactly what Jews had sought by Zionism. To challenge Palestinians on this ground would mean Israelis would find themselves querying a right they themselves had asserted and therefore implicitly question the legitimacy of the Israeli project itself.

In 1973, John B. Wolf made a similar diagnosis to that advanced by Sherman: the 1967 war had compelled Palestinians to recognize the truth of their isolation from allies, and their "Palestinianism" thereby developed two goals: to reintegrate themselves with the land they lost, and strive to change a politics that had excluded and 'negated their presence', denying Palestinians a say in their own future.

Edward Said's adoption of the term
The word assumed some importance in the 1980s when the Palestinian academic Edward Said, author of the influential book Orientalism which analysed bias in foreign representations of the Arab world, adopted it. For Said, Israel and its supporters had striven to deny Palestinians, with their long and fragmented history of dispossession, war, exile and ethnic cleansing, 'permission to narrate' what they had undergone as a result of the establishment of the state of Israel. Said defined the term as 'a political movement that is being built out of a reassertion of Palestine's multiracial and multireligious history.' According to Adam Shatz, US editor for the London Review of Books, Said endeavoured to elaborate a 'counter-myth' to that which underwrote Zionism, one written in counterpoint to the 'dark historical fatalism and exclusionary fear of the other' characteristic of the Zionist narrative. "Palestinianism" for Said referred to a kind of open-ended dissident narrative testifying to the contradictions of exile and military occupation, one that was non-doctrinal, unobsessed with racial ontology, as a premise for the creation of a future for both Palestinians and Jews.

As construed by Ilan Pappé, Said's "Palestinianism" was a compromise between the narrow call of nationalist impulses and the universal values he subscribed to, consisting in striving to overcome both Zionism and Arab tyrannies by the three principles of acknowledgement, accountability and acceptance: namely, global recognition of the nakba which was more important than achieving Palestinian statehood; in obeisance to universal principles, Israel should accept its accountability for ethnic cleansing, as a prelude to a future return of refugees; and, thirdly, an acceptance of the historic reality of Jewish suffering, a precondition for integrating Israelis into the larger Arab world within which their state was founded.

Haim Gerber, professor of Islamic history at the Hebrew University of Jerusalem, argued in 2004 that, as one could see from the research of Rashid Khalidi on the press in Arabic before WW1, a national Palestinian sentiment, or "Palestinianism", was attested before the onset of fully-fledged Zionist emigration under the British Mandate.

Two years later, Jason Franks employed it to denote the ensemble of values, beliefs, traditions and history underwriting Palestinian nationhood. In his analysis, it stood in diametrical opposition to Zionism, and both it and Zionism were twin ideological codes competing in the Israeli–Palestinian conflict, both accounting for the terroristic, nationalist and religious elements driving the conflict.The roots of Palestinianism lay, he further argued, in the Young Turks' revolt in 1908, which was crucial to the emergence of a Palestinian nationalist sentiment in that period because the revolution in Turkey freed up the press from Ottoman censorship, and enabled local assertions of a distinct identity to emerge. It developed thereafter 'not only (as) a reaction against Zionism and British imperialism but also against the wider Arab world.'

In her 2016 monograph on Palestinian film history, Chrisoula Lionis challenged the recency theory of Palestinian identity. In tracing the development of national awareness, she detects a transition via three core episodes from 'Palestinianess', stirred by both the Balfour Declaration of 1917, and the 1948 nakba, which crystallised this national consciousness of Palestinianess, to 'Palestinianism' proper, which she sees as the outcome of the Battle of Karameh in 1968.

Palestinianism as a threat to Western civilization
A year after Gerber's article, in 2005, and writing in the context of the Al-Aqsa Intifada, Bat Ye'or, in her book Eurabia: The Euro-Arab which peddled a conspiracy theory, dedicated a whole chapter to the word, entitled "Palestinianism: The New Eurabian Cult", where she claimed that Palestinianism, which she glossed as 'Palestinolatry', was both a new vehicle for traditional European anti-Semitism, and 'a return of the Euro-Arab Nazism of the 1930-1940s.' In her view, it emerged with the works of the Anglican bishop and theologian Kenneth Cragg and the Palestinian Anglican priest Naim Ateek, director of the Jerusalem-based Sabeel Ecumenical Liberation Theology Center. Neither of these writers, however, had ever used the term at the time of her writing, but Bat Ye'or deployed it to characterize what she saw as ecclesiastical attempts to play on European consciences by depicting Palestinian suffering under Israeli occupation. The impact of this 'Palestinianism' can be discerned, she claimed further, in the positions of major politicians in Europe, ranging from Jacques Chirac, Javier Solana, Romano Prodi to Dominique de Villepin and Mary Robinson, who came to consider the Palestinian problem a central issue for world peace. For her, Christian evocations of the plight of Palestinians betrayed an underlying tradition of Christian demonization of Jews, and had assumed the status of a 'modern Eurabian cult'. More specifically, in theological terms, she interpreted this 'Christian Palestinianism' as heretical, because she claimed that it was a variety of Marcionism.

Soon after (2006) Bat Ye'or's polemic, the term was picked up as a negative description for the Palestinian cause, by British journalist Melanie Phillips in her Londonistan: How Britain Is Creating a Terror State Within, where she claimed that the Muslim Association of Britain, in her view an arm of the Muslim Brotherhood, had become the 'spearhead' of 'radical Palestinianism.' in Great Britain.

In 2007, the idea that Palestinian national rights were a threat to Western civilization, and in particular to its religious values, was argued for in a book by evangelical theologian Paul Wilkinson, assistant Minister at Hazel Grove Full Gospel Church in Stockport, Cheshire and a member of Tim LaHaye's Pre-Tribulation Rapture Research Center. A British Christian Zionist, in that year he devoted a chapter in his book For Zion's Sake, to what he called "Christian Palestinianism", as the antithesis of Christian Zionism. He pursued his assertions in more detail in 2017, in the second volume, entitled Israel Betrayed – Volume 2: The rise of Christian Palestinianism, of his study of replacement theology.

Wilkinson's critique of Christian Palestinianism holds that Christians must acknowledge that God's 'sovereign hand' established Israel in 1948. Only pro-Zionists are true Christians, since the ingathering of Jews to Palestine is a precondition for the parousia, or return of Christ the King. Unconditional support of the Jewish state of Israel is premised on a Christian anticipation of the Messianic end time. Wilkinson says that there is no such thing as a Palestinian people, their nation, language, culture and religion are hoaxes perpetrated by anti-Christian liberals. The very idea itself is merely 'another tactical manoeuvre in the Islamic war waged against Israel to effect her destruction.' Other Christians, in particular Palestinian Christians who criticize Israel, speaking of the 'perceived' suffering of Palestinians, foment Jew-hatred in favouring pro-Palestinian propaganda.  Non-Zionists are anti-Semitic Nazi sympathizers. The book was excoriated by theologian Darren M. Slade. professor of humanities at the Rocky Mountain College of Art and Design.

Usage in polemics against Palestinians, 2010–2021
In 2010 Palestinianism was described by Israeli journalist Moshe Dann as an 'ideology', that viewed Israel as a settler-colonial state, and one which had two immediate goals: Palestinian statehood in the Palestinian territories defined by the 1949 armistice lines, and the implementation of the right of return of Palestinian refugees. According to Dann, who repeated his claims in 2021, the long-term goal of the 'elimination of Israel' was explicitly called for in both the Palestinian National Covenant, (nullified in 1996 after the Oslo Accords), and the Hamas Covenant (a provision cancelled in 2017). This 'ideology' had been, he asserted, legitimized by Israel itself by the 1993 Oslo Accords. Dann claimed that Palestinian identity is a fiction contrived to oppose Israel as the nation-state of the Jewish people, and that Israel was entitled to the Palestinian West Bank because it was full of Jewish archaeological sites, with no evidence for any Palestinian historical heritage, there or anywhere else in Palestine.

According to Tower Magazine journalist, and former advisor to The Israel Project Ben Cohen, Palestinianism is the core ideology informing recent antisemitism, one that assumes the guise of a social movement which, bundling together neo-fascists, liberals, extreme leftists, and Islamicists, is militantly opposed to the age of Jewish self-empowerment after 1945.

In 2018, a pro-Israeli English blogger David Collier, whose mission was described as one 'show(ing) everybody how toxic our enemies are,' Palestinianism was a threat to freedom of speech and the cause of human rights, an infective agent of anti-Semitism:
'Palestinianism' is a disease that is anathema to freedom, to debate, to openness and to human rights. ... It will infect those who catch the disease with anti-Semitism just as it provides them with a denial mechanism to protest their innocence.'

Criticism of hostility to Palestinianism
In 2021, analyzing American bipartisan congressional attacks on Democratic Party colleagues ('the Squad') such as Rashida Tlaib, Ilhan Omar, Ayanna Pressley and Alexandria Ocasio-Cortez for their having criticized Israel's human rights record, the Zionist critic Peter Beinart, writing in Jewish Currents, rose to the defense of the latter. He argues that the allegations of the former, that such criticism was anti-Semitic, was itself evidence of bigotry – 'treating people as inferior because of their group identity' – and takes the form of anti-Palestinianism, which is, he claims, commonplace throughout American society.

The bigotry of anti-Palestinianism, for Beinart, is 'ubiquitous' notwithstanding the fact that, unlike 'anti-Israeli'/'anti-Jewish', the word 'anti-Palestinian' hardly exists. Any google search, he found, will unfold an endless number of links associating such politicians with antisemitism, whereas Google yields no evidence that the congressmen he cites – Michael Waltz, Jim Banks, Claudia Tenney, Ted Deutch, Josh Gottheimer, Kathy Manning, Elaine Luria, and Dean Phillips – who repeat these accusations in the House of Representatives, are hostile to Palestinians, despite strong evidence for their bias in this regard. Beinart considers that the group of Democrats accusing Israel of apartheid practices or Jewish supremacist territorial ambitions (B'tselem) are simply reflecting an opposition to violations of international law: a view shared by NGOs like Human Rights Watch. Beinart makes an historical analogy between anti-Semitism and anti-Palestinianism. There was no term to denote treating Jews as inferior before pressure for treating Jews equally gained some political traction in the 19th century. Once they had achieved legal recognition, the term anti-Semitism came into vogue to denote those hostile to parity of rights for Jewish citizens. A similar logic applies to the term (anti-)Palestinianism. Throughout the 20th century, American and Israeli discourse hardly tolerated a word like 'Palestinian'. It is still unmentionable that Palestinians also deserve equality, and relentless allegations that those who advocate for Palestinian equality are ipso facto anti-Semitic constitute, for Beinart, a form of bigotry. The effectiveness of the IHRA definition of anti-Semitism strikingly illustrates the way, thus construed, anti-Palestinian oppressive practices are silenced.

Notes

References

Citations

Works cited

1970s neologisms
Anti-Zionism
Arab movements
Nationalists of Middle Eastern nations
Palestinian nationalism
Palestinian solidarity movement
Political movements
Syncretic political movements